Jens Scharping (born 16 July 1974) is a German former professional footballer who played as a striker. He spent two seasons in the Bundesliga with FC St. Pauli, as well as eight seasons in the 2. Bundesliga with St. Pauli, Rot-Weiß Oberhausen, VfB Lübeck, and Alemannia Aachen.

References

External links

1974 births
Living people
Footballers from Hamburg
German footballers
Association football forwards
Bundesliga players
2. Bundesliga players
FC St. Pauli players
Rot-Weiß Oberhausen players
FC Eintracht Norderstedt 03 players
Lüneburger SK players
VfB Lübeck players
Alemannia Aachen players